KAZA (1290 kHz) is a commercial AM radio station licensed to Gilroy, California, and serving Santa Clara Valley.  It airs a radio format of Vietnamese language music and talk, and is branded Viên Thao Radio. The station is owned by Tron Dinh Do, through licensee Intelli, LLC.

By day, KAZA is powered at 1,500 watts. But to reduce interference to other stations on 1290 AM, it reduces power at night to 19 watts. It uses a non-directional at all times.

History
KPER was founded by Don Bernard and Chuck Jobbins, co-owners of the Bernard & Jobbins Broadcasting Company. After being granted a construction permit by the Federal Communications Commission (FCC) on January 23 that year, the station first broadcast on August 31, 1957, with call sign KPER and five watts of power. The FCC officially granted KPER its broadcast license on November 21, 1957, and KPER increased its transmitting power to 500 watts and was licensed as a daytime-only station. A member of the Keystone Broadcasting System, KPER also broadcast programming in Spanish and Portuguese. KPER increased its power to 1,000 watts on January 21, 1959. On May 2, 1963, KPER increased its power to 5,000 watts, a level continued to this day.

On October 3, 1966, Bernard & Jobbins sold KPER to South Valley Broadcasters for $325,000. KPER became KAZA on July 15, 1967. By 1968, KAZA began broadcasting 85 hours of Spanish programming weekly, in contrast to seven hours of Portuguese.

South Valley Broadcasters sold KAZA to Radio Fiesta on March 29, 1973, for $522,500.

KAZA began carrying Spanish language broadcasts of Oakland Raiders games in 2002, the most recent season the Raiders made the Super Bowl. The broadcasts continued for the 2003 season, before they moved to KZSF in 2004.

In November 2010, Tron Dinh Do's Intelli LLC began operating KAZA on a local marketing agreement with Radio Fiesta and began broadcasting the Vietnamese language Viên Thao Radio network. Radio Fiesta ultimately sold KAZA to Intelli for nearly a million dollars in October 2014. KAZA lost its directional antenna transmitter site in Gilroy in late 2014. It is operating under U.S. Federal Communications Commission special temporary authority with 1,250 watts day and 20 watts night nondirectional using KZSJ's tower.

See also
 KZSJ
 KVVN

References

External links
  Viên Thao Media

AZA (AM)
Gilroy, California
AZA
Radio stations established in 1957
1957 establishments in California